Song Dan (born 5 July 1990 in Wenjiang District, Chengdu, Sichuan) is a female Chinese javelin thrower.

Song competed at the 2008 Olympic Games, without reaching the final.

Her personal best throw is 60.68 metres, achieved in March 2008 in Chengdu.

References

Team China 2008

1990 births
Living people
Athletes (track and field) at the 2008 Summer Olympics
Chinese female javelin throwers
Olympic athletes of China
Sportspeople from Chengdu
Athletes from Sichuan
21st-century Chinese women